Beowulf Glacier is a small north-flowing glacier located between Mime Glacier and the head of Rhone Glacier in the Asgard Range, Victoria Land. It was named in 1983 by the New Zealand Antarctic Place-Names Committee from association with Mount Beowulf which stands at the head of this glacier.

References
 

Glaciers of the Asgard Range
Glaciers of Scott Coast